The 1978 World Women's Handball Championship took place in Czechoslovakia from between 30 November-10 December 1978. East Germany won the tournament ahead of Soviet Union and Hungary.

Qualification
Host nation
 

Qualified from the 1976 Summer Olympics
 
 
 

Qualified from the 1977 World Championship B
 
 
 
 
 

Qualified from the 1978 All-African Games
 

Qualified from Asia
 

Qualified from the Americas

Preliminary round

Group A

Group B

Group C

Final round

Group 7-9

Final Group

Final standings

References

Source: International Handball Federation

World Handball Championship tournaments
W
W
W
Women's handball in Czechoslovakia
November 1978 sports events in Europe
December 1978 sports events in Europe